Godbole (Marathi: गोडबोले) (Pronunciation: gōde-bolæ) is a Marathi surname that means sweet tongued.

Notable people bearing the name include:

Achyut Godbole
Kishori Godbole
Mangala Godbole
Manohar Godbole
Narasinh Narayan Godbole
Parshuram Ballal Godbole
Rekha Godbole
Rohini Godbole
Jayant Godbole Jayant Godbole retired as Chairman of Industrial Development Bank of India in 2005

References

Indian surnames
Marathi-language surnames